Bin Badal Barsaat is a 1975 Pakistani film starring Zeba and Mohammad Ali.

It is directed and produced by Zeenat Begum. The film follows a married couple, Zarina and Judge Akbar Ali, who struggle to have a child. The film also stars Shahid, Sangeeta, Lehri, Nanha, Nirala and Ilyas Kashmiri.

Synopsis 
Zarina (Zeba) and Judge Akbar Ali (Ali) struggle unsuccessfully to have a child. The couple eventually succeeds in having a son, but the child goes missing following a convoluted series of events and ends up in a gang of beggars led by Dada (Ilyas Kashmiri). The child and family are eventually reunited thanks to the efforts of a dancing girl named Gori (Sangeeta) and her fiancé Badshah.

Cast
 Zeba as Zarina
 Mohammad Ali as Akbar Ali
 Shahid as Badshah
 Sangeeta as Gori
 Ilyas Kashmiri as Dada
 Lehri
 Nanha
 Nirala
 Seema

Soundtrack
The music is composed by the only female composer of Pakistani film industry Shamim Nazli.

Reception 
The film was a commercial success upon its release. In a retrospective review published in 2017, the film's plot and acting were panned, but the film's soundtrack, composed by Shamin Nazli, was praised, and the film is described as a valuable case study of women's roles in Lollywood.

References

External links

1975 films
1970s Urdu-language films
Films about poverty
Pakistani drama films
Urdu-language Pakistani films